Pool 1 of the Second Round of the 2006 World Baseball Classic was held at Angel Stadium of Anaheim, Anaheim, California, United States from March 12 to 16, 2006.

Like the first round, Pool 1 was a round-robin tournament. The final two teams advanced to the semifinals.

Standings

Results
All times are Pacific Standard Time (UTC−08:00).

United States 4, Japan 3

South Korea 2, Mexico 1

South Korea 7, United States 3

Japan 6, Mexico 1

South Korea 2, Japan 1

Mexico 2, United States 1

External links
Official website

Pool 1
World Baseball Classic Pool 1
21st century in Anaheim, California
International baseball competitions hosted by the United States
International sports competitions in California
World Baseball Classic Pool 1
Baseball competitions in Anaheim, California